The Kuwait Towers are a group of three  thin towers in Kuwait City, standing on a promontory into the Persian Gulf. They were the sixth, and last, group in the larger Kuwait Water Towers system of 34 towers (33 store water; one stores equipment), and were built in a style considerably different from the other five groups. The Kuwait Towers were officially inaugurated in March 1979 and are regarded as a landmark and symbol of modern Kuwait. The towers were closed for maintenance from March 2012 to 8 March 2016, with a massive fireworks festival commemorating the re-opening. Kuwait Towers facility is operated and managed by the state-owned Touristic Enterprises Company. The Main Tower served as the venue for TEDxKuwaitCity event in 2018 and 2019.

Design and construction
The third tower does not store water, housing equipment to illuminate the two larger towers. The two water towers hold  of water altogether. 

The Kuwait Towers were designed by Danish architect Malene Bjørn as part of a water distribution project run by the Swedish engineering company VBB (renamed Sweco in 1997). Chief architect of the company and husband of Malene Bjørn, Sune Lindström, erected five groups of his typical "mushroom" water towers, the Kuwait Water Towers, but the Emir of Kuwait, Sheikh Jaber Al-Ahmed, wanted a more attractive design for the sixth site. Out of ten different designs, three were presented to the Amir, who chose the design built.

VBB contracted construction of the three Kuwait Towers to Energoprojekt construction company of Belgrade, Yugoslavia (now part of Serbia). The towers were built of reinforced concrete and prestressed concrete. Building took place from 1971 to 1976 and the main tower was opened to the public on 1 March 1979.

Approximately 41,000 enameled steel discs cover the three spheres in eight shades of blue, green and gray, recalling the tiled domes of historic mosques. The discs are arranged in spiral patterns around the spheres. According to the architect, the Kuwait Tower group refers to ideals of humanity and technology, symbolised by the globe and the rocket.

Recognition
In 1980, the Kuwait Water Towers system, including the Kuwait Towers, was an inaugural recipient of the Aga Khan Award for Architecture.

Gallery

See also
 List of tallest towers in the world
 Liberation Tower (Kuwait)
 Dar Al Awadi Tower

Notes

Printed sources
 Kultermann, Udo, 1999. Contemporary architecture in the Arab states: Renaissance of a region. New York; London: McGraw-Hill. 
 Kultermann, Udo, 1981. Kuwait Tower. Malene Bjorn's work in Kuwait. MIMAR: Architecture in Development, 1981:2. pp. 40–41. Hasan-Uddin Khan, ed. Singapore: Concept Media Ltd. ISSN 0129-8372 
 Water Towers, 1983. In: Renata Holod, editor; Darl Rasdorfer, associate editor. 1983. Architecture and Community: building in the Islamic world today: the Aga Khan Award for Architecture. pp. 173–181. Millerton: Aperture; Oxford: Phaidon.

Sources
 Aga Khan Award for Architecture. Retrieved 5 August 2012
 Website of the Kuwait Towers. Retrieved 5 August 2012

External links

 Architects of Kuwait
 
 Glass Steel and Stone: Kuwait Towers
 3D model of the towers for use in Google Earth
 Kuwait Towers: History, Art, Architecture and Eternity

1979 establishments in Kuwait
Towers completed in 1979
Buildings and structures in Kuwait City
Water towers in Kuwait
Tourist attractions in Kuwait